James Joseph Macken  (1927–2019) was an Australian lawyer, judge and human rights activist.

Career
MacKen was admitted as a barrister in July 1963, and worked in cases of employment law. on 2 June 1975 he was appointed a judge of the Industrial Commission of NSW and retired on 21 August 1989.

Subsequent career
After retiring as a judge, Macken continued to work as an academic and author, including lecturing in industrial relations at Sydney Law School.

In September 2016, Macken offered to trade places with a refugee at one of the immigration detention camps operated in Nauru or Manus under Australia's Pacific Solution policy.

Death
Jim Macken died in his sleep on 19 September 2019. He is survived by his eleven children, two brothers and twenty-three grand children.

Honours
In June 2003 Macken was made a Member of the Order of Australia for service  to industrial relations as an advocate, judge, academic and author.

Selected bibliography

References

1927 births
2019 deaths
Australian human rights activists
20th-century Australian judges
Australian barristers
Members of the Order of Australia